Josia oribia is a moth of the family Notodontidae first described by Herbert Druce in 1885. It is found in the eastern Andean foothills of Peru and Bolivia.

It is engaged in Müllerian mimicry with Erbessa mimica.

External links
"Josia oribia Druce 1885 ". Tree of Life Web Project. Retrieved December 29, 2019.

Notodontidae of South America
Moths described in 1885